Jade De Rijcke (December 2, 2003) is a Belgian singer. De Rijcke won The Voice Kids Belgium in 2018 with the clean version "Perfect" by Pink.

In 2019, she signed a contract with Universal and in March of that year, she would release her first single, "Straw House". Followed by a second single "Your Type" which was released in September. She released her third and fourth singles "Lately" and "When I Cry" on 23rd September, 2020 and 28th January, 2022 respectively. 

On 6th May 2022, it was announced, that Jade will represent Belgium at Europops Song Contest 2022. Her song "Pages" was released on 7th September, 2022. The Grand Final was held on 11th November. Jade has won the contest with her song "Pages" getting 553 points in total.

References 

 
 

Living people
2003 births
21st-century Belgian women singers
21st-century Belgian singers
The Voice Kids contestants